Major-General Sir John Kennedy  (1878–1948) was a senior British Army officer who served in the First World War and commanded 1st Division.

Military career
Educated at Haileybury, Kennedy was commissioned into the Argyll and Sutherland Highlanders in 1898. He served with the Egyptian Army until the First World War when he fought on the Western Front: he became Commanding Officer of 7th Bn Seaforth Highlanders in 1916 and Commander of 26th (Highland) Brigade in 1917. He was appointed Inspector of Infantry in 1918, Instructor at the Senior Officers School in 1919 and Commanding Officer of 2nd Bn The Buffs in 1923. He went on to be Commander of 19th Indian Infantry Brigade in 1926, General Officer Commanding 44th (Home Counties) Division in January 1933 and General Officer Commanding 1st Division in April 1934 before retiring in 1937.

References

|-

1878 births
1948 deaths
British Army major generals
British Army generals of World War I
Argyll and Sutherland Highlanders officers
Knights Grand Cross of the Order of the British Empire
Companions of the Order of the Bath
Companions of the Order of St Michael and St George
Companions of the Distinguished Service Order
People educated at Haileybury and Imperial Service College